Hwang Bo-ram (황보람  or  ; born 6 October 1987) is a South Korean football player for Icheon Daekyo WFC and the South Korean national team. She participated at the 2015 FIFA Women's World Cup.

References

External links

1987 births
Living people
South Korean women's footballers
South Korea women's international footballers
2015 FIFA Women's World Cup players
WK League players
Women's association football defenders
Footballers at the 2006 Asian Games
Universiade gold medalists for South Korea
Universiade medalists in football
2019 FIFA Women's World Cup players
Asian Games competitors for South Korea
Medalists at the 2009 Summer Universiade
21st-century South Korean women